Jeriquara is a municipality (município) in the state of São Paulo in Brazil. The population is 3,151 (2020 est.) in an area of 142 km². The elevation is 860 m.

References

Municipalities in São Paulo (state)